Bethany Yellowtail (born 1989) is a Native American fashion designer based in Los Angeles, California. Known for her work that reflects her Indigenous heritage, she is an enrolled member of the Northern Cheyenne Tribe and a descendant of the Crow Tribe of Montana. She serves as designer and CEO for her line B.Yellowtail.

Early life and education 
Yellowtail was born in the small rural town of Wyola, located in the southeast corner of Montana near the Wyoming border. She is an enrolled member of the Northern Cheyenne Tribe and grew up with her four siblings and parents on the Crow Reservation.

Aunts and grandmothers taught Yellowtail to sew.

Yellowtail attended Tongue River schools in Ranchester, Wyoming, 23 miles from her family's ranch in Wyola, Montana. She graduated from Tongue River High School in 2007.
She attended the Fashion Institute of Design and Merchandising.

Career 
Yellowtail began working in fashion with the BCBG Max Azria Group, then became a pattern maker for private labels before founding her own company B.Yellowtail in 2014.

In 2015, Bethany was selected as a First Peoples Fund Artist in Business Leadership Fellow.

As a Native designer, Yellowtail confronts cultural appropriation in the fashion industry.

PBS Indie Lens Storycast featured B.Yellowtail as part of a series of short films called alter-NATIVE by Billy Luther.

Political 

Yellowtail is an active supporter of women's rights. For the 2017 Women's March on the National Mall in Washington D.C., Yellowtail collaborated with fellow Montana artist John Isaiah Pepion to create a custom-designed scarf featuring Native American women, each wearing a War Bonnet. In Crow Nation culture, women traditionally do not wear a full headdress, except for the special occasion of the Shoshone War Bonnet Dance, regarded as the highest honor for Crow women. Yellowtail chose the design to underscore female empowerment and respect. The scarf was worn by the many indigenous women as part of the Indigenous Women Rise, a grassroots advocacy group first gathering at the Women's March.

Yellowtail includes the works of several Native American artists and designers as part of The B.Yellowtail Collective, part of her efforts to support the entrepreneurship of fellow Native Americans.

Personal 
Bethany Yellowtail is a member of the Northern Cheyenne Nation, and hails from the Mighty Few District of the Crow Nation in Southeastern Montana. Yellowtail now in located in Los Angeles.

Gallery work 
Along with Bethany Yellowtail’s two fashion labels, the designer has also touched into the gallery world, such as having an artist spotlight at the Portland Art Museum. The spotlight from June 2016 discusses Yellowtail’s heritage and what drives her inspiration in the fashion industry. The Field Museum in Chicago also hosted Yellowtail in an exhibit called “Apsáalooke Women and Warriors” where her designs are featured. The exhibit features a range of works such as historical and contemporary pieces from different generations and tribes.

References

External links 
 byellowtail.com/

Living people
21st-century Native Americans
American fashion designers
American women fashion designers
American chief executives of fashion industry companies
American women chief executives
Northern Cheyenne people
Crow people
Indigenous fashion designers of the Americas
1989 births
21st-century Native American women